Joel Perovuo (born 11 August 1985 in  Helsinki) is a  Finnish professional football player who currently plays for the Ykkönen side IF Gnistan in Finland. Besides Finland, he has played in Sweden and Poland.

Career
Perovuo began his career with Espoon PS in the youth side, before moving to FC Honka. He gradually became an important player in the Honka team. In December 2009 Djurgården announced that Perovuo had signed with the Swedish team.

On 12 August 2011 it was announced that Perovuo had signed for the reigning Finnish champions, HJK, for two-and-half years. He made his debut for HJK on 18 August as he came on as a substitute in a 2–0 home victory over Schalke in the Europa League playoff-round.

In 2015 Perovuo returned to FC Honka after the team was relegated to Kakkonen due to financial problems.

International career
On 11 October 2009 was called up by the Finland national team. Perovuo made his first appearance for Finland at senior level on 18 January 2010. He was at starting line-up, but was replaced by Paulus Arajuuri at 84th minute.

References

External links

 
 Veikkausliiga Profile
 Stats at Guardian Football

1985 births
Living people
Footballers from Helsinki
Finnish footballers
Finnish expatriate footballers
Finland international footballers
Veikkausliiga players
Kakkonen players
Ykkönen players
Allsvenskan players
Ekstraklasa players
FC Honka players
Djurgårdens IF Fotboll players
Helsingin Jalkapalloklubi players
Jagiellonia Białystok players
IF Gnistan players
Association football midfielders
Finnish expatriate sportspeople in Sweden
Finnish expatriate sportspeople in Poland
Expatriate footballers in Sweden
Expatriate footballers in Poland